György Zala (born January 19, 1969 in Budapest) is a Hungarian sprint canoeist who competed from 1989 to 2001.

Competing in three Summer Olympics, he won two bronze medals in the C-1 1000 m event, earning them in 1992 and 1996.

Zala, a hyperactive child, took up canoeing at the age of 11. A great natural athlete despite suffering from asthma, it seemed he was only truly motivated by the Olympics. Between Olympiads he tended to fall out of sight, focussing instead on his other passions such as extreme sports.

It was not until later in his career that he won any world or European championship titles. He took to his new role as the "old man" of the Hungarian four-man crew with enthusiasm, helping his younger teammates to victory in the C-4 1000 m event at the 2000 European Championships in Poznań. The following year he returned to Poznań, this time for the world championships and, despite injury, won two golds (C-4 200 m and C-4 1000 m). Zala also won six additional world championship medals with four silvers (C-1 1000 m: 1990, C-4 500 m: 1989, 2001; C-4 1000 m: 1995) and two bronzes (C-2 500 m: 1990, C-2 1000 m: 1998).

He is 173 cm (5'8) tall and raced at 84 kg (185 lbs).

References

General references

1969 births
Canoeists at the 1992 Summer Olympics
Canoeists at the 1996 Summer Olympics
Canoeists at the 2000 Summer Olympics
Hungarian male canoeists
Living people
Olympic canoeists of Hungary
Olympic medalists in canoeing
ICF Canoe Sprint World Championships medalists in Canadian

Medalists at the 1996 Summer Olympics
Medalists at the 1992 Summer Olympics
Olympic bronze medalists for Hungary
Canoeists from Budapest
20th-century Hungarian people